Vera Lysklætt (born 29 January 1954 in Jøssund) is a Norwegian politician for the Liberal Party (V). She was elected to the Norwegian Parliament from Finnmark in 2005. She came in on a leveling seat, in spite of low local support in the county with only 818 votes, or 2 percent.

She was a member of Karasjok municipal council from 1999 to 2003.

Parliamentary Committee duties 
2005 - 2009 member of the Standing Committee on Local Government and Public Administration.

External links
Stortinget.no - Bio
Valgtriller mellom Raymond og Vera (Close race between Raymond and Vera, article in Norwegian)

1954 births
Living people
Liberal Party (Norway) politicians
Women members of the Storting
Members of the Storting
21st-century Norwegian politicians
21st-century Norwegian women politicians